Songhwa milsu is a kind of Korean traditional drink made of pine flower pollen (songhwa) and honey. It is said beneficial for relieving thirst caused by the heat of summer. It also made as an effective remedy for relieving respiratory ailments, neuralgia and headaches.

See also
Shikhye
Hwachae
Yoon Sook-ja

References

Korean drinks